Barefoot at Dawn is a Canadian drama film from Quebec, directed by Francis Leclerc and released in 2017. Written by Leclerc and Fred Pellerin as an adaptation of Félix Leclerc's semi-autobiographical novel Pieds nus dans l'aube, the film stars Justin Leyrolles-Bouchard as the young Félix Leclerc growing up in La Tuque, Quebec. Roy Dupuis and Catherine Sénart also appear as Félix's parents, Leo and Fabiola Leclerc, and Robert Lepage as his uncle Rodolphe.

The film represented Francis Leclerc's first attempt to openly address his legacy as the son of Félix Leclerc, one of Quebec's musical icons, in his own work.

The film received three Prix Iris nominations at the 20th Quebec Cinema Awards in 2018: Best Cinematography (Steve Asselin), Best Costume Design (Josée Castonguay) and Best Visual Effects.

References

External links

2017 films
Canadian biographical drama films
2017 biographical drama films
Films set in Quebec
Films directed by Francis Leclerc
Films based on Canadian novels
2017 drama films
French-language Canadian films
2010s Canadian films